Dentist (Amendment) Bill, 2016  is an Indian legislation which is an amendment to the Dentist act, 1948. It was passed by Rajya Sabha on 1 August 2016 approving the applicability of NEET.

Act

10 D 
Uniform entrance examination for all dental college for UG & PG level in languages like Hindi, English and other languages

References 

Indian legislation
Dentistry in India
1948 in law
1948 in India